The Fekete Sereg Youth Association is a non-governmental organization, based in Nagyvázsony, whose main aim is to provide a useful pastime for young people from Nagyvázsony and the surrounding area. In 2022 the Volunteer Center Foundation awarded the Vázsonykő project as the “Best Volunteer Program of the Year” in Hungary.https://www.veol.hu/helyi-kozelet/2022/12/orszagos-elismerest-kapott-a-fekete-sereg

Origin of the name
Fekete Sereg literally means "black army", which was a common name given to the military forces serving under the reign of King Matthias Corvinus of Hungary. The most famous general of the army was Pál Kinizsi, whose central estate was the Castle of Nagyvázsony. For this reason, the founders decided to name the association in honour of the famous general Kinizsi. The Kinizsi cult retains its importance to the village even in modern times. For example, the name of the castle is "Kinizsi-vár" or "Castle of Kinizsi". Overall, the name symbolizes the cult of Kinizsi and the attachment to local traditions.

Main activities
The Association has several activities targeting students, unemployed, minorities (gypsies), disadvantaged and handicapped people. The activities include:
 EVS (European Voluntary Service)
 Media program (since 2001): Publisher of a local newsletter (Sereghajtó) and the local TV

Memberships
 EVS (European Voluntary Service): The association is an accredited European Voluntary Service hosting, sending and coordinating association
 Anna Lindh Foundation

Sources

Organizations established in 1997
International organisations based in Hungary